was one of four principal naval shipyards owned and operated by the Imperial Japanese Navy.

History
The Maizuru Naval District was established at Maizuru, Kyoto Prefecture in 1889, as the fourth of the naval districts responsible for the defense of the Japanese home islands. After the establishment of the navy base, a ship repair facility was established in 1901 with a dry dock. With the addition of equipment and facilities for ship production by 1903, the Maizuru Naval Arsenal was officially established.

Additional dry docks were completed in 1904 and 1914. When the No. 3 dry dock was completed in 1914, it was the largest in Japan at the time. In 1923, after the Washington Naval Treaty, there were discussions within the Navy Ministry about closing the facility, and it was largely mothballed until 1936. Afterwards, it reopened and expanded, building ships, aircraft and weapons for the military.
It specialized mostly in destroyer-size and smaller vessels.

Post WW II
In the post-World War II period, a private company, Iino Industries Co. Ltd., took over and formed the Maizuru Shipyards.

In 1963, the name was changed to Maizuru Heavy Industries. In 1971, it was merged with Hitachi Zosen Corporation. In 2002, Hitachi Zosen spun off the shipbuilder into a joint venture with JFE Engineering called Universal Shipbuilding Corporation. Universal Shipbuilding Corporation and IHI Marine United Inc. united and became Japan Marine United in 2013.

The former head office and some warehouses associated with the shipyards are preserved as commemorative museums by the Maizuru city government. The pre-war dry docks and one of the large cranes are still in use today.

Ships built at Maizuru Naval Arsenal

Russo-Japanese War 

 Kamikaze-class (1905): Oite, Yūnagi, Uranami, Isonami, Ayanami

World War I 

 Umikaze-class: Umikaze
 Sakura-class: Sakura, Tachibana
 Kaba-class: Kaede
 Minekaze-class: Minekaze, Okikaze, Shimakaze, Nadakaze, Shiokaze, Tachikaze, Hokaze, Nokaze, Namikaze, Numakaze
 Wakatake-class: Kuretake
 Enoki-class: Enoki
 Momo-class: Kashi, Hinoki

World War II 

 3 of 9 : Harukaze, Matsukaze, Hatakaze
 2 of 12 : Kisaragi, Kikuzuki
 6 of 24 : Fubuki, Hatsuyuki, Shikinami, Yūgiri, Sazanami, Hibiki
 1 of 6 : Yugure
 2 of 10 : Harusame, Umikaze
 2 of 10 : Ōshio, Arare
 5 of 19 : Kagerō, Oyashio, Amatsukaze, Nowaki, Arashi
 6 of 19 : Yūgumo, Makinami, Hayanami, Hamanami, Okinami, Hayashimo
 Shimakaze
 4 of 12 : Akizuki, Hatsuzuki, Fuyutsuki, Hanazuki
 10 of 32 Matsu/Tachibana-class: Matsu, Momo, Maki, Kaya, Tsubaki, Nire, Shii, Enoki, Odake, Hatsuume

total: 41 of 153 (27%) of Japanese destroyers that were relevant during WW2

See also
JDS Kashima (TV-3508)

References

External links
 Maizuru Naval Arsenal Commemorative Museum (in Japanese)

Imperial Japanese Navy
Shipbuilding companies of Japan
Defunct companies of Japan
 
Shipyards building World War II warships